The Sauga is a right-bank tributary of the Pärnu. It is 79.2 km long, starting near Järvakandi and flowing into the Pärnu river in Pärnu. It has a drainage area of 576.5 km2.

The river is a home to a variety of fish, including northern pike, common roach, yellow perch.

References

External links
 

Geography of Pärnu
Rivers of Estonia